Sébastien Serge Louis Desabre (born 2 August 1976) is a French professional football manager, who is the current manager of DR Congo.

Nicknamed The Florist he served as manager of the Uganda national team from 28 December 2017 until 7 July 2019.

Managerial career
Desabre was born in Valence. His past managerial jobs include ES Cannet-Rocheville, ASEC Mimosas, Coton Sport and Espérance de Tunis. He was also head coach of Ismaily SC in the Egyptian Premier League. He has also coached Recreativo do Libolo, Dubai Club, JS Saoura and Wydad AC.

In December 2017, prior to the 2018 African Nations Championship competition, he signed a multiple-year contract with the Federation of Uganda Football Associations to manage the Uganda national team at a gross monthly salary of $25,000. He replaced Milutin Sredojević, who left in July 2017 to become coach of the Orlando Pirates. On 17 November 2018, the Cranes qualified for the 2019 African Cup of Nations after defeating Cape Verde. In November 2018, the Uganda national team was nominated with five others for the CAF Men's national team of the year award 2018.

Uganda qualified for the 2019 Africa Cup of Nations from 21 June until 19 July 2019. The team advanced out of Group A, to the round of 16, in second position, behind group leader and tournament hosts, Egypt. However, the team was eliminated after losing 1–0 to Senegal on 5 July 2019. The following day, in a statement released by FUFA in Kampala, Desabre's contract with the Cranes was terminated by mutual consent despite the success.

On 8 July 2019, Desabre was announced as the new head coach of the Egyptian Premier League club Pyramids FC. On 19 January 2020, Desabre rejoined Wydad AC.

In 2022, he was appointed coach of DR Congo national football team, replacing the Argentine Héctor Cúper, after DR Congo failed to qualify for the 2022 FIFA World Cup. His contract lasted for four years, with the aim to guide DR Congo to the 2026 FIFA World Cup.

Managerial statistics

Honours
ES Cannet-Rocheville
Régional 2 Group B: 2006–07
Division d'Honneur Méditerranée: 2007–08

ASEC Mimosas
Coupe de Côte d'Ivoire: 2011
Coupe Houphouët-Boigny: 2012

Coton Sport
Elite One: 2013

Espérance de Tunis
Tunisian Ligue Professionnelle 1: 2013–14

Recreativo do Libolo
Girabola: 2015

References

External links
 

 Sébastien Desabre Interview
 Sébastien Desabre Interview with Sofoot

1976 births
Living people
French football managers
Coton Sport FC de Garoua managers
Espérance Sportive de Tunis managers
JS Saoura managers
Wydad AC managers
Ismaily SC managers
Uganda national football team managers
Pyramids FC managers
Chamois Niortais F.C. managers
Elite One managers
Tunisian Ligue Professionnelle 1 managers
Girabola managers
Algerian Ligue Professionnelle 1 managers
Botola managers
Egyptian Premier League managers
2019 Africa Cup of Nations managers
Ligue 2 managers
French expatriate football managers
French expatriate sportspeople in Ivory Coast
French expatriate sportspeople in Cameroon
French expatriate sportspeople in Tunisia
French expatriate sportspeople in Angola
French expatriate sportspeople in the United Arab Emirates
French expatriate sportspeople in Algeria
French expatriate sportspeople in Morocco
French expatriate sportspeople in Uganda
French expatriate sportspeople in Egypt
Expatriate football managers in Ivory Coast
Expatriate football managers in Cameroon
Expatriate football managers in Tunisia
Expatriate football managers in Angola
Expatriate football managers in the United Arab Emirates
Expatriate football managers in Algeria
Expatriate football managers in Morocco
Expatriate football managers in Uganda
Expatriate football managers in Egypt
Sportspeople from Valence, Drôme